How to Become Happy is a 1986 Soviet comedy-science fiction film directed by Yuri Chulyukin.

Plot
1980 year. In the small town of Lesogorsk lives a modest teacher of physics. He invents a miracle device that can determine in a child the ability to a profession and the degree of talent. The inventor comes to Moscow, but everyone is skeptical about his device.

Ten years pass. The future is coming and, according to the predictions of the inventor, talents begin to appear one after another and all of them come from Lesogorsk: artists, sportsmen, scientists ... Gosha, a correspondent of a Moscow newspaper, who missed a sensation ten years ago, rushes with his son to seek the genius. However, it's too late, as the inventor has already died ...happy

Cast
Nikolai Karachentsov — Gosha
Marina Dyuzheva — Zoya, Gosha's wife
Lev Durov — old man-inventor
Vladimir Shevelkov — Slava
Yelena Valyushkina — Lida
Tatyana Pelttser — Lida's grandmother
Kirill Golovko-Sersky — Vovik, son of Gosha and Zoya
Victor Filippov — Uncle Borya
Semyon Farada — Kolobok
Ion Ungureanu — Director of the Brain Institute Dmitry Sergeevich
Lyudmila Chulyukina — Raechka
Vsevolod Shilovsky — editor-in-chief
Sergey Balabanov — Misha
Igor Yasulovich — speaker at the opening of the monument
Alexander Maslyakov — presenter of the contest
Vadim Aleksandrov — editorial officer of Bald
Vladimir Nosik — fellow of the Brain Institute
Nikolay Karnaukhov — watchman Stepanych
Ksenia Kozmina — Vivarium of the Institute of the Brain
Zoya Vasilkova — fellow of the Institute of the Brain
Zoya Isaeva — editorial employee
Rano Hamrayeva — fellow of the Institute of the Brain
Alexander Levshin — researcher of the Institute of the Brain

References

External links

Soviet musical comedy films
1980s science fiction comedy films
Russian science fiction comedy films
Russian musical comedy films
Mosfilm films
1986 comedy films
1986 films